Milson Island is located in New South Wales, Australia. It was first settled over 100 years ago and has been used as a bacteriological station, quarantine station, a hospital to treat soldiers from WWI with venereal disease, mental hospital, a rehab for alcoholics, a women's jail, and now a sports and recreation centre. 

It is in the middle of the Hawkesbury River, so the only means of transport is by ferry. Some of the activities available at Milson Island include a high ropes course, rock climbing, canoeing, kayaking, archery, bushwalking and abseiling. The accommodation is 3-4 stars with seven lodges (Possum, Koala, Waratah, Kookaburra, Lorikeet, Platypus and Cockatoo) and five holiday units. The camp usually suits two small schools or a big school at the same time. It is a popular place for camps for many schools across Sydney, and families go there for a nice, relaxed and fun retreat.

All that is left of the old mental asylum is the nurses' quarters or hospital. When the mental asylum was operating, an alarm system was set up, so that people on the island could keep themselves safe from mad escapees. The nurses' quarters are now rotted away, but the furnishings from the asylum still remain.

The Sport and Recreation Centre still uses the refurbished sleeping quarters as the dining room and kitchen. The rooms at Milson Island range from school kids' rooms that sleep up to five people to lodges for one to four people.

See also
 Peat Island

References

External links
 NSW Department of Sport & Recreation - Milson Island
  [CC-By-SA]

Islands of New South Wales
River islands of Australia